Lincoln Speedway, located in Lincoln, Illinois on the Logan County Fairgrounds, is a 1/4 mile dirt race track that opened in 2004. Lincoln Speedway races on Friday nights. After running races sanctioning by the United Midwestern Promoters (UMP), it switched to DIRTcar sanction.

In 2007 Lincoln Speedway hosted events for World of Outlaws Late Model Series and UMP Summernationals as well as their local racing series'.  2008 will see more of the same from both sanctioning bodies, as well as full-time sanctioning from United Midwestern Promoters.  In 2008, Lincoln Speedway acquired their very own 2-seat Late Model, and offer rides in it after the racing program is finished. Lincoln Speedway's season opening race for 2011 is Friday, April 8, and the speedway will also hold a NASCAR Night on Tuesday, June 14 for the first time ever. The track was scheduled to be the first co-sanctioned event with the World of Outlaws Late Models and UMP Hell Tour in July 2016 but it rained out.

Thursday, September 3, 2015 Lincoln Speedway become operated by Bob Sargent's Track Enterprises, which also manages Macon Speedway. The previous 2 seasons had been run by Ken Dobson of CILTRAK, which promoted Quincy Raceways and Jacksonville Speedway at the time.  He still runs Jacksonville today.

Major events

Racing classes
DIRTcar Pro Late model
DIRTcar Modified
DIRTcar Street Stock
DIRTcar Midget
DIRTcar Hornet (4 cylinders)

Track records
The record for the fastest time in Late Model qualifying is 12.219 seconds posted by Dennis Erb Jr. of Carpentersville, Illinois on June 28, 2009.
The track record for Midgets was set when the USAC Midgets made their first ever visit on July 2, 2017 by Tanner Thorson of Mendon, Nevada at 13.616 seconds

References

External links

Buildings and structures in Logan County, Illinois
Motorsport venues in Illinois
Tourist attractions in Logan County, Illinois